Jonas Wheeler (February 9, 1789 – May 1, 1826) was an American politician and lawyer. Born in Concord, Massachusetts, Wheeler graduated from Harvard College in 1810. He served as Justice of the Peace, the first representative of Camden, Maine to the Maine House of Representatives and Camden's State Senator. He was the President of the Maine Senate from 1825 until his death in May 1826.

References

1789 births
1826 deaths
Maine lawyers
People from Concord, Massachusetts
People from Camden, Maine
Harvard College alumni
Members of the Maine House of Representatives
Presidents of the Maine Senate
Maine Democratic-Republicans
19th-century American politicians
19th-century American lawyers